Qol Qoleh (also known as Qol Qoleh-ye Reyjāb) is a village in Ban Zardeh Rural District, in the Central District of Dalahu County, Kermanshah Province, Iran. At the 2006 census, its population was 158, in 26 families.

References 

Populated places in Dalahu County